William I of Hauteville (before 1010 – 1046), known as William Iron Arm, was a Norman adventurer who was the founder of the fortunes of the Hauteville family. One of twelve sons of Tancred of Hauteville, he journeyed to the Mezzogiorno with his younger brother Drogo in the first half of the eleventh century (c.1035), in response to requests for help made by fellow Normans under Rainulf Drengot, count of Aversa.

Between 1038 and 1040, he and other Normans fought in Sicily along with the Lombards as mercenaries for the Byzantine Empire against the Kalbids. It was there that he won his nickname "Iron Arm" by single-handedly killing the emir of Syracuse during a sally at the siege of Syracuse. When the Byzantine general George Maniakes publicly humiliated the Salernitan leader, Arduin, the Lombards withdrew from the campaign, along with the Normans and the Varangian Guard contingent. After Maniakes was recalled to Constantinople, the new catapan of Italy, Michael Doukeianos, appointed Arduin the ruler of Melfi.  Melfi, however, soon joined other Apulian Lombards in a revolt against Byzantine rule, in which they were supported by William and the Normans. The Byzantines, however, managed to buy off the nominal leaders of the revolt – first Atenulf, brother of Pandulf III of Benevento, and then Argyrus. In September 1042, the Normans elected their own leader, ignoring Arduin. The revolt, originally Lombard, had become Norman in character and leadership.

William was elected by the Normans as their count after the defection of Argyrus. He and the other leaders, chief among them Drogo and Peter, petitioned Guaimar IV, Prince of Salerno, for recognition of their conquests. They received the lands around Melfi as a fief and proclaimed Guaimar "Duke of Apulia and Calabria". At Melfi in 1043, Guaimar divided the region (except for Melfi itself) into twelve baronies for the benefit of the Norman leaders: Asclettin received Acerenza, Tristan received Montepeloso, Hugh Tubœuf received Monopoli, Peter received Trani, and Drogo received Venosa. William himself, predominant among the Norman leaders, received the lordship of Ascoli. He was married to Guida, daughter of Guy, duke of Sorrento, and niece of Guaimar. 

During his reign, William and Guaimar began the conquest of Calabria in 1044 and built the great castle of Stridula, probably near Squillace. In 1045, he was defeated near Taranto by Argyrus. He died in early 1046 and was succeeded by his brother Drogo.

His titles were never confirmed by the Holy Roman Emperor. Drogo would be legally called "Count of the Normans in all Apulia and Calabria" (Comes Normannorum totius Apuliae e Calabriae), and so William is usually titled likewise.

References
Ghisalberti, Albert (ed). Dizionario Biografico degli Italiani: II Albicante – Ammannati. Rome, 1960.
Gwatkin, H.M., Whitney, J.P. (ed) et al. The Cambridge Medieval History: Volume III. Cambridge University Press, 1926.
Norwich, John Julius. The Normans in the South 1016–1130. Longmans: London, 1967.
Chalandon, Ferdinand. Histoire de la domination normande en Italie et en Sicilie. Paris, 1907.
Gravett, Christopher, and Nicolle, David. The Normans: Warrior Knights and their Castles. Osprey Publishing: Oxford, 2006.
Beech, George. A Norman-Italian Adventurer in the East: Richard of Salerno. 1993.

Notes

External links
History of the Norman World.
Leeds Medieval History Texts in Translation.
Norman Centuries – A Norman History Podcast by Lars Brownworth.

11th-century Normans
Norman mercenaries
Norman warriors
1046 deaths
Counts of Apulia and Calabria
Year of birth uncertain
Hauteville family
Burials at the Abbey of Santissima Trinità, Venosa